Huoying station is an interchange station on Line 8 and Line 13 of the Beijing Subway.

History 
The station for Line 13 opened on September 28, 2002.
It was the terminus of Line 13 between September 28, 2002 and January 9, 2003.

The station for Line 8 opened on December 31, 2011.

Station Layout 
The line 8 station has an underground island platform. The line 13 station has at-grade dual-island platforms. The outer eastbound line 13 platform is a terminating platform.

Exits 
There are 9 exits, lettered A, E, F1, F2, G1, G2, G3, G4, and H. Exits F1 and G1 are accessible.

Gallery

References

External links

Beijing Subway stations in Changping District
Railway stations in China opened in 2002